Trichopsomyia is a genus of Hoverflies, from the family Syrphidae (flower flies), in the order Diptera.

Biology
Hover flies like the Trichopsomyia are small flies with large heads and eyes, and small antennae. Their bodies are medium to slender, with a waist that is not significantly narrow, unless it is a wasp mimicking species. They have one pair of clear wings, and the banded forms have yellow and black bands. Hoverflies resemble wasps or bees because of their black and yellow-striped abdomens. However, they are actually members of a fly family that have evolved to mimic wasps and bees for protection.

Hoverfly larvae are flattened, legless and maggot-like. Most are green or brown in colour. They are carnivorous and eat aphids.

Species
Trichopsomyia antillensis (Thompson, 1981)
Trichopsomyia apisaon Walker, 1849
Trichopsomyia australis (Johnson, 1907)
Trichopsomyia currani (Fluke, 1937) 
Trichopsomyia banksi Curran, 1921)
Trichopsomyia biglumis (Matsumura, 1916)
Trichopsomyia boliviensis (Shannon, 1927)
Trichopsomyia flavitarsis (Meigen, 1822)
Trichopsomyia granditibialis (Fluke, 1937) 
Trichopsomyia lasiotibialis (Fluke, 1937) 
Trichopsomyia joratensis Goeldlin, 1997
Trichopsomyia litoralis Vockeroth, 1988
Trichopsomyia longicornis  (Williston, 1888) 
Trichopsomyia lucida (Meigen, 1822)
Trichopsomyia nigritarsis (Curran, 1924)
Trichopsomyia occidentalis (Townsend, 1897)
Trichopsomyia ochrozona (Stackelberg, 1952)
Trichopsomyia pilosa (van Steenis & Wyatt, 2020)
Trichopsomyia polita Williston, 1888
Trichopsomyia pubescens (Loew, 1863)
Trichopsomyia puella (Williston, 1888) 
Trichopsomyia recedens (Walker, 1852)
Trichopsomyia rufithoracica (Curran, 1921)
Trichopsomyia similis (Curran, 1924)
Trichopsomyia tuberculata  (Williston, 1888)
Trichopsomyia tshapigou  (Kuznetzov, 1990)
Trichopsomyia urania  (Hull, 1949)

References

Diptera of Europe
Diptera of North America
Pipizinae
Hoverfly genera
Taxa named by Samuel Wendell Williston